Millmont Farm is a historic home and farm complex at Montgomery Township in Franklin County, Pennsylvania. The property includes the main house, a double log house, a stone and frame secondary dwelling, a large frame bank barn, and the site of a grist mill.  The main house was built between 1798 and 1821, and is a 2-story, five bay stone dwelling with a -story rear wing.  It has a vernacular Georgian plan.  The property was owned by James Ramsey, whose granddaughters were the sisters Jane Irwin Harrison (1804–1846), daughter-in-law of and White House hostess for U.S. President William Henry Harrison, and Elizabeth Ramsey Irwin Harrison (1810–1850), mother of U.S. President Benjamin Harrison.

It was listed on the National Register of Historic Places in 1979.

References 

Farms on the National Register of Historic Places in Pennsylvania
Houses on the National Register of Historic Places in Pennsylvania
Georgian architecture in Pennsylvania
Houses completed in 1821
Houses in Franklin County, Pennsylvania
National Register of Historic Places in Franklin County, Pennsylvania